Sofia Kenin was the defending champion, but chose not to participate.

Madison Brengle won the title, defeating Danielle Lao in an all-American final, 7–5, 7–6(12–10).

Seeds

Draw

Finals

Top half

Bottom half

References
Main Draw

Stockton Challenger - Singles